John William Illingworth (3 September 1904 – 1964) was an English professional footballer who played for Castleford Town, Northfleet United, Tottenham Hotspur, Swansea City and Barry Town.

Football career 
Illingworth began his playing career at his local club Castleford Town before joining the Tottenham Hotspur "nursery" club Northfleet United. In 1929 the right back signed for Tottenham Hotspur where he featured in 12 matches in all competitions for the Lilywhites between 1929 and 1934. After leaving White Hart Lane, Illingworth had a spell at Swansea City and finally Barry Town.

References 

1904 births
1964 deaths
English footballers
Sportspeople from Castleford
English Football League players
Tottenham Hotspur F.C. players
Swansea City A.F.C. players
Barry Town United F.C. players
Castleford Town F.C. players
Footballers from Yorkshire
Northfleet United F.C. players
Association football fullbacks